Josias Priest (c. 1645 – 3 January 1735 in Chelsea, London) was an English dancer, dancing-master and choreographer.

Biography
In 1669, Priest was arrested along with four others for dancing and making music without a license. In 1668, he was a dancing-master in Holborn, and in 1675 he moved to Leicester Fields to run a boarding school for gentlewomen. In 1680 he started a similar school at Gorge's House in Chelsea, London. Here Priest  hosted operas, including John Blow's Venus and Adonis (1684) and Henry Purcell's Dido and Aeneas (1689). It is widely believed that Priest choreographed dances for these and other semi-operas by Purcell, including Dioclesian, The Fairy-Queen, The Indian Queen, and King Arthur ; however, the evidence is not entirely conclusive. 

In 1699 Thomas Bray published a collection of dance music which included music for dances by Josias Priest and his son, Thomas Priest. Only one dance by Priest survives, a 'Minuet by Mr Preist' in An Essay for the Further Improvement of Dancing (1711) published by Edmund Pemberton.  References to Priest's choreography remain in some musical sources, however.  The surviving minuet is for twelve women and uses a limited step vocabulary of minuet steps forwards, backwards and sideways, the main choreographic interest being in the floor patterns.  It is recorded in a simplified form of Beauchamp–Feuillet notation that was typically used for recording English country dances.

Notes

References
Jennifer Thorp. "Josias Priest", Grove Music Online, ed. L. Macy (accessed July 22, 2006), grovemusic.com (subscription access).

1640s births
1735 deaths
English choreographers
English male dancers
People from Chelsea, London
Dance education
17th-century dancers